Cendere (historically known as Çandar) is a village in the District of Nallıhan, Ankara Province, Turkey.

Despite its small size today, during the early days of the Ottoman Empire, Cendere (then named Çandar) was an important town, and the politically powerful and wealthy Çandarlı family originated from the village, as did the first Grand Vizier of the Ottoman Empire, Alaeddin Pasha.

See also
 Çandarlı family

References

Villages in Nallıhan District